The Beaufort Range is a mountain range on southern Vancouver Island, British Columbia, Canada, located north of Port Alberni and to the west of Qualicum Beach, and running from Horne Lake in the southeast to Comox Lake in the northwest. It has an area of 448 km2 and is a subrange of the Vancouver Island Ranges which in turn form part of the Insular Mountains.

The range is named for Sir Francis Beaufort, hydrographer to the Royal Navy.

See also
List of mountain ranges

References

External links
 
 Beaufort Range, Lindsay Elms. Retrieved June 29, 2008.

Vancouver Island Ranges
Mid Vancouver Island
Alberni Valley
Mountain ranges of British Columbia